James of Venice was a Catholic cleric and significant translator of Aristotle of the twelfth century. He has been called "the first systematic translator of Aristotle since Boethius." Not much is otherwise known about him.

He was active in particular in Constantinople; he translated the Posterior Analytics from Greek to Latin in the period 1125–1150. This made available in Western Europe for the first time in half a millennium what was then called the New Logic, in other words the full Organon. He also translated Physics, On the Soul, and Metaphysics (the oldest known Latin translation of the work).

See also 
 Latin translations of the 12th century
 Logica nova

Notes

References
 L. Minio-Paluello, "Iacobus Veneticus Grecus: Canonist and Translator of Aristotle." Traditio 8 (1952), 265–304
 Sten Ebbesen (1977). "Jacobus Veneticus on the Posterior Analytics and Some Early Thirteenth-century Oxford Masters on the Elenchi." Cahiers de l'Institut du moyen âge grec et Latin 2, 1-9.

External links
 

Italian translators
Greek–Latin translators
12th-century Venetian people
12th-century Italian Roman Catholic priests
12th-century Byzantine writers
12th-century translators